Clementina is a feminine given name (derivative of Clement). Notable people with the name include:

 Patricia Clementina (fl. 590), politically active aristocrat in Byzantine Naples
 Clementina Agricole (*1988), Seychellois weightlifter
 Archduchess Clementina of Austria (1798-1881), Austrian archduchess
 Archduchess Maria Clementina of Austria (1777-1801), Austrian archduchess
 Clementina Batalla (1894-1987), Mexican lawyer
 Clementina Black (1853-1922), English writer
 Clementina Butler (1862-1949), American evangelist and author
Clementina Curci (1952-1990), Italian housewife murdered in Singapore
 Clementina Díaz y de Ovando (1916-2012), Mexican writer
 Clementina Drummond-Willoughby, 24th Baroness Willoughby de Eresby (1809-1888), British baroness
 Clementina Forleo (*1963), Italian judge
Clementina D. Griffin (1886-1980), American educator
 Clementina de Jesus (1901-1987), Brazilian samba singer
 Clementina Maude, Viscountess Hawarden (1822-1865), English portrait amateur photographer
 Clementina Mulenga, Cleo Ice Queen (*1989), Zambian born hip hop recording artist
 Clementina Otero (1909-1996), Mexican actress
 Clementina Panella, Italian archeologist
 Clementina Poto Langone (1896–1964), civil leader
 Clementina Rind (1740-1774), first female newspaper printer
 Clementina Robertson (1795 – 1853), Irish painter
 Maria Clementina Sobieska (1702-1735), Queen consort of England 
 Clementina Suárez (1902 – 1991), Honduran writer
 Clementina Tompkins (1848-1931), US painter
 Clementina Trenholme (1843-1918), US author
 Clementina Walkinshaw (1720-1802), mistress of Bonnie Prince Charlie